The 2020 Varsity Cup was the 13th season of the Varsity Cup, the top competition in the annual Varsity Rugby series. It was played between 4 February and 31 May 2021 and featured ten university teams.

This tournaments will take place in a Covid-19 short round 6 clash was cancelled.

Competition rules and information

There were nine participating university teams in the 2020 Varsity Cup. They played each other once during the pool stage, either at home or away. Teams received four points for a win and two points for a draw. Bonus points were awarded to teams that scored four or more tries in a game, as well as to teams that lost a match by seven points or less. Teams were ranked by log points, then points difference (points scored less points conceded).

The top four teams after the pool stage qualified for the semifinals, which were followed by a final.

Teams

The teams that played in the 2022 Varsity Cup are:

Pool stage

Standings
The final log for the 2020 Varsity Cup was:

Matches

The following matches were played in the 2020 Varsity Cup:

References

2022
2020 in South African rugby union
2020 rugby union tournaments for clubs